Ritchey Knob is a summit located on the Blue Knob massif. This mountain is connected to Pine Knob and forms the northernmost summits of the massif.

Ritchey Knob is the fourth highest of this grouping behind Blue Knob , Herman Point  and Schaefer Head .

Based on  data, it ranks as the 15th highest mountain in Pennsylvania and the 37188th highest mountain in the United States.

References
 

Mountains of Pennsylvania
Allegheny Mountains
Landforms of Blair County, Pennsylvania